Zgornja Besnica is a settlement in central Slovenia. It lies in the hills east of the capital Ljubljana and belongs to the City Municipality of Ljubljana. It is part of the traditional Lower Carniola region. It is now included with the rest of the municipality in the Central Slovenia Statistical Region.

Geography
Aslivka Creek rises west of the village, below Javor, and then flows east to join Besnica Creek in Zgornja Besnica.

References

External links

Zgornja Besnica on Geopedia

Populated places in the City Municipality of Ljubljana
Sostro District